Brady Bryant (born February 13, 1982) is an American soccer player.

Career

College and Amateur
Bryant played college soccer at The Citadel before transferring to the University of Mobile before his sophomore season, where he was a 2002 NAIA honorable mention (third team) All American.

Bryant also played for the Chicago Eagles Select and West Michigan Edge, both of the Premier Development League during his collegiate career.

Professional
Bryant signed with the Wilmington Hammerheads of the USL Second Division in 2004, he .  He spent three seasons with Wilmington before unexpectedly moving to the National Indoor Football League in 2007, where he played as a wide receiver for the Columbia Stingers.

In 2008, he returned to soccer with unsuccessful trials at the Portland Timbers and Charleston Battery of the USL-1.  He was then signed by the Charlotte Eagles of the USL-2 where he was a 2008 first team USL-2 All Star.

Personal
Bryant is the son of Bobby Bryant, a defensive back with the Minnesota Vikings

References

1982 births
Living people
American soccer players
USL Second Division players
Charlotte Eagles players
Chicago Eagles Select players
The Citadel Bulldogs men's soccer players
University of Mobile alumni
Soccer players from Minnesota
West Michigan Edge players
Wilmington Hammerheads FC players
USL League Two players
USL Championship players
Association football defenders
Sportspeople from Minneapolis
Players of American football from Minnesota
American football wide receivers
Major Indoor Soccer League (2008–2014) players
Wichita Wings (2011–2013 MISL) players
Wichita B-52s
Footballers who switched code
National Indoor Football League players